This article deals with the history and development of tanks employed by the military of Sweden, from the interwar period, and  World War II, the Cold War and modern era.

History 
Following World War I, the Swedish government purchased parts for the German tank prototype LK II and then assembled in Sweden as the Stridsvagn m/21 (Strv m/21 for short), which was essentially an improved version of the LK II prototype. Ten of these tanks were built, their armament a single  machine gun.

In 1929, five were rebuilt to create the Strv m/21-29 variant which was armed with a 37mm gun or two machine guns and was powered by a Scania-Vabis engine. The Stridsvagn m/31 (Landsverk L-10) tank was the next design and built by AB Landsverk. It was armed with a 37 mm Bofors gun and a light machine gun, and was equipped with 8–24 mm armor. Only three were built and, despite being highly advanced for the time when World War II broke out, they were dug in as static bunkers.

Sweden ordered forty-eight tankettes in 1937 as the Stridsvagn m/37 (Strv m/37) after a successful demonstration during winter conditions in the Krkonoše Mountains. Its turret mounted two Swedish  Ksp m/36 strv machine guns and sported a small observation cupola on its top. It carried a radio and 3960 rounds for its machine guns. The last components were shipped in November 1938.

On 1 September 1939, at the outbreak of war, Sweden relied on a numerous army through conscription and the use of a Total Defence policy. Throughout World War II, Sweden held the largest infantry army of the Nordic countries with more than 1,000,000 soldiers.

When the war broke out in 1939, Sweden had one armoured division consisting of merely 13 light tanks, only 3 of which were considered to be modern (the remaining 10 had been in service since the 1920s).

During the war, Sweden had the Stridsvagn m/41 which was a license-built version of the Czechoslovak TNH medium tank, and also the Landsverk L-60 light tank. The L-60 was adopted by the Swedish army in 4 main variants: Stridsvagn m/38, Stridsvagn m/39, Stridsvagn m/40L and Stridsvagn m/40K.  The most significant Swedish tank development during the war was the Stridsvagn m/42 (Strv m/42) a medium tank it fielded with a 75 mm L/34 gun, the first of its size in a Swedish tank. It entered service with the Swedish army in November 1941. Modern in design, it was also well protected and mobile. A total of 282 were produced.

In 1945, the number of tanks serving the Swedish army had increased from 13 to more than 800. As a neutral nation in World War II, Sweden did not engage in combat; thus its tanks have no battlefield record.

The Stridsvagn 74 was a tank in use with the Swedish Army from 1958 to 1984. It was a modification of the older Stridsvagn m/42, which was phased out of service in the early 1950s. Instead of scrapping the vehicles altogether, the chassis were used to build a new tank which could be used as a supplement to the newly bought stridsvagn 81. The turret of the strv 74 was completely new, with a 75 mm high-velocity gun based on an old anti-aircraft gun, engines and transmission were modified or changed from the strv m/42, broader tracks and a separate electrical engine for the turret rotation was introduced while retaining the manual control as a backup.

The Stridsvagn 103  is a Swedish post-World War II main battle tank. It is known for its unconventional design: it is turretless with a fixed gun traversed by engaging the tracks and elevated by adjusting the hull suspension. While turretless armoured fighting vehicles are usually classified as assault guns or tank destroyers, despite its unique gun laying process the Strv 103 is considered a tank because its designated combat role matched those of other tanks within contemporary Swedish doctrine. It is the only mass-produced tank since World War II to dispense with a turret.

The Strv 103 was designed and manufactured in Sweden. It was developed in the 1950s and was the first main battle tank to use a turbine engine. The result was a very low-profile design with an emphasis on survivability and heightened crew protection level. Strv 103s formed a major portion of the Swedish armoured forces from the 1960s to the 1990s, when, along with the Centurions, it was replaced by the Stridsvagn 121 and the Stridsvagn 122, variants of the Leopard 2.

List of Swedish tanks

See also

 History of the tank
 Tanks in World War II
 Tank classification
 List of military vehicles
Military equipment of Sweden during World War II
Military equipment of Sweden during the Cold War

Sources and further reading 
Home page of the Swedish Armed Forces
http://www.soldf.com/
See article links for further information on specific equipment

References

 
Tanks of the Cold War
World War II tanks of Sweden
History of the tank